Pruszkowski (feminine: Pruszkowska, plural: Pruszkowscy) is a Polish surname. It may refer to: 
 Pruszków County
 Andrzej Pruszkowski (born 1960), Polish politician
 Tadeusz Pruszkowski (1888-1942), Polish painter
 Witold Pruszkowski (1846-1896), Polish painter

See also
 
 Pruszków (disambiguation)
 Proskauer

Polish-language surnames